The XV Island Games (also known as the 2013 NatWest Island Games for sponsorship reasons) were held in Bermuda from 13 to 19 July 2013. Bermuda was selected to host the Games by default after Prince Edward Island withdrew from the International Island Games Association.

It was the first time that the games were held outside Europe.

Participating islands
22 island entities of the IIGA from Europe, South Atlantic and the Caribbean area competed in these games. Rhodes and Sark declined their invitations to the games.

 (64)
 (6)
 (Host) (100)
 (69)
 (49)
 (84)
 (16)
 (75)
 (58)
 (74)
 (100)
 (34)
 (85)
 (30)
 (79)
 (33)
 (29) 
 (43)
 (46)
 St. Helena (8)
 (22)
 Ynys Môn (23)

Sports
Numbers in parentheses indicate the number of medal events contested in each sport.

Calendar

Medal table

References

External links
Island Games 2013

 
Island Games
Island Games
2013 in Bermudian sport
Multi-sport events in the United Kingdom
International sports competitions hosted by Bermuda
July 2013 sports events in North America